Żeliszów  is a village in the administrative district of Gmina Bolesławiec, within Bolesławiec County, Lower Silesian Voivodeship, in south-western Poland. Prior to 1945 it was in Germany.

The village houses a Protestant church designed in 1796-1797 by Carl Gotthard Langhans, which is currently undergoing renovation overseen by the Your Heritage Foundation (Fundacja Twoje Dziedzictwo).

References

Villages in Bolesławiec County